Speculations is an anthology of 17 short science fiction stories published by Houghton Mifflin in 1982. It was edited by Isaac Asimov and Alice Laurance. Instead of crediting the authors in the usual manner, it encouraged readers to guess who wrote which story, and provided a code which could be broken to give the answers.

Contents

Foreword: The Scope of Science Fiction, Isaac Asimov
Nor Iron Bars a Cage, Roger Robert Lovin
Surfeit, Alan Dean Foster
The Winds of Change, Isaac Asimov
Harpist, Joe L. Hensley
Great Tom Fool, or The Conundrum of the Calais Customhouse Coffers, R. A. Lafferty
The Hand of the Bard, Mack Reynolds
The Man Who Floated in Time, Robert Silverberg
Flee to the Mountains, Rachel Cosgrove Payes
Last Day, Gene Wolfe
The Newest Profession, Phyllis Gotlieb
A Break for the Dinosaurs, Jack Williamson
Event at Holiday Rock, Jacqueline Lichtenberg
A Touch of Truth, Alice Laurance and William K. Carlson
"Do I Dare to Eat a Peach?" Bill Pronzini and Barry N. Malzberg
...Old...As a Garment, Zenna Henderson
Flatsquid Thrills, Scott Baker
The Mystery of the Young Gentleman, Joanna Russ
Biographies of the Authors (uncredited)
To Break the Code (uncredited)

External links
Speculations at the Internet Speculative Fiction Database

ISBN

1982 anthologies
Science fiction anthologies
Isaac Asimov anthologies